Municipal elections were held in Essex County in Ontario on October 24, 2022 in conjunction with municipal elections across the province.

Essex County Council
Essex County Council consists of the 7 mainland mayors of Essex County and their seven deputy mayors.

Amherstburg
The following are the results for mayor and deputy mayor of Amherstburg.

Mayor
Mayor Aldo DiCarlo did not run for re-election.

Deputy mayor

Essex

Mayor
The following were the results for mayor of Essex.

Deputy mayor
The following were the results for deputy mayor of Essex.

Kingsville
The following were the results for mayor and deputy mayor of Kingsville.

Mayor
Mayor Nelson Santos stepped down as mayor on July 17 to take a job outside the region, and therefore did not run for re-election. Deputy mayor Gord Queen served as acting mayor in the interim.

Deputy mayor

Lakeshore
The following are the results for mayor, deputy mayor and the municipal council of Lakeshore.

Mayor
Incumbent mayor Tom Bain lost to deputy mayor Tracey Bailey.

Deputy Mayor

Municipal Council

LaSalle

Mayor
Incumbent mayor Marc Bondy did not run for re-election.Crystal Meloche was elected as mayor of LaSalle by acclamation.

Deputy mayor
The following candidates are running for deputy mayor of LaSalle.

Leamington
The following are the results for mayor and deputy mayor of Leamington.

Mayor

Deputy mayor

Tecumseh
The following were the results for deputy mayor of Tecumseh.

Mayor

Deputy mayor

References

Essex
Essex County, Ontario